The works of Manilal Dwivedi (26 September 1858 – 1 October 1898) consists of poems, plays, essays, adaptation of an English novel, book-reviews, literary criticism, research, editing, translations, compilations and autobiography that Gujarati writer and philosopher Manilal Dwivedi created over his lifetime. Manilal's writing career started in 1876 with a poem, Shikshashatak, and continued till his death in 1898. After Manilal's death, his most works were edited and published by Gujarati writer and scholar Dhirubhai Thaker, who is considered to be an authority on Manilal Dwivedi.

Manilal's most writings appeared in his own monthlies Priyamvada and Sudarshan, which he edited from 1885 until his death. He translated several works into Gujarati from English, Sanskrit and Hindi. He offered critical editions with English translation of various Sanskrit and Prakrit works in the Gaekwad Oriental Series of Baroda.

Works
The list of works by Manilal Dwivedi:

Gujarati

Original

Translation and Adaptation
{| 
| align="center" style="background:#f0f0f0;"|Name of the Publication
| align="center" style="background:#f0f0f0;"|Year of Publication
| align="center" style="background:#f0f0f0;"|Notes
|-
| colspan="3" style="text-align:center;" |From Sanskrit
|-
|Malatimadhava||1880 ||
|-
|Uttararamacharitam ||1882 ||
|-
|Shrinmd Bhagavad Gita ||1894 ||
|-
|Panchshati ||1895 ||
|-
|Vivada-tandava ||1901 ||
|-
|Chatuhsutri ||1909 ||
|-
|Ramagita || - ||Unpublished
|-
|Shishupalavadham ||- || (With commentary) incomplete
|-
|Hanuman Natakam ||- || Incomplete
|-
|Mahaviracharitam ||- || Incomplete
|-
|Chhandonushasanam ||- || Incomplete
|-
|Samaradityacharitam ||- || Incomplete
|-
|Alankarachudamani ||- || Incomplete
|-
|Jyotishkaranda ||- || Incomplete
|-
|Vrittaratnakaravritti ||- || Incomplete
|-
|Rudrashringaratilakam ||- || Incomplete
|-
|Rasmanjaritika ||- || Incomplete
|-
| Naishadhiyatika ||- || Incomplete
|-
|Svadvada-ratnakaravatarika ||- || Incomplete
|-
|Abhinandanakavyam (or Nabhinandan) ||- || Incomplete
|-
| colspan="3" style="text-align:center;" |From English
|-
|Chestertonno Putra Prati Upadesh tatha Samkshipta Suvakya || 1890 || In collaboration with Gopaldas H. Desai
|-
|Charitra ||1895 ||
|-
| Chetanashastra ||1896 ||
|-
|Vakpatava ||1897 ||
|-
|Gulabsinh ||1897 || An adaptation of Edward Bulwer-Lytton's Zanoni
|-
|Shikshan ane Svashikshan ||1897 ||
|-
|Nyayashastra-paramarshakhand ||1897 ||
|-
|Swami Vivekanandani Americani Mulakato || Unpublished
|-
| colspan="3" style="text-align:center;" |From Hindi
|-
|Shri Vrittiprabhakara ||1895 ||
|-
|}

Edited with translations

English
Original

Edited with translation

Magazines
In 1885, Manilal founded and edited a journal called Priyamvada to discuss the problems faced by Indian women. In 1890, the same journal became wider in scope and was renamed Sudarshan''.

References

Sources

External links
 Works by Manilal Dwivedi at Gandhi Heritage Portal
 
 

Works by Manilal Dwivedi
Works by Indian writers